St Luke's is an Anglican church in Clifford, West Yorkshire, England, part of the New Ainsty Deanery. It is one of three churches in Clifford; the second largest after St. Edward King and Confessor.

History
Of the three churches in Clifford, St Luke's is the oldest having been completed in 1842. The church was designed by John Bownas and William Atkinson and part financed by the Lane-Fox family of Bramham Park who also donated the land. The first stone was laid on St Luke's Day, 18 October 1840 and it opened in June 1842 having cost £1500 to build.  The church was Grade II listed in 1988.

Architecture

The church is of a cruciform plan and of a Gothic Revival nature. Built of Magnesian Limestone, it has a pitched slate roof. The tower is situated to the western end of the church and is of two stages and originally had four pinnacles atop it, these however were deemed unsafe and removed in 1905 (a similar fate later befell the nearby St. James' Church).

See also
Listed buildings in Clifford, West Yorkshire

References

External links

"St. Luke's Church, Clifford", Clifford Parish Council
"St Luke, Clifford", Church of England, Achurchnearyou.com

Clifford
Grade II listed churches in Leeds
Clifford, St. Luke's
Churches completed in 1842
19th-century Church of England church buildings